Nazr-e-Bad (Urdu:; lit: Look of Evil) is a Pakistani black magic-based romantic television drama serial which aired on Hum TV 25 January 2017 replacing previously concluded drama Hatheli. It starrs Azfar Rehman and Sarah Khan in leading to pivot roles.

The story is penned by Imran Nazir who previously written Mohabbat Aag Si which was strongly hit because of appearance of Azfar Rehman, Sarah Khan and Iffat Rahim and directed by Iqbal Hussain, who is famous for his previously directed drama Seeta Bagri and is produced by Moomal Shunaid under Moomal Entertainment.This serial was a great success and loved by the people because of its reality like most of the times these types of Black Magic are happening in our society.

Story
Nazr-e-Bad is a drama about the old superstitious concept of Nazr-e-Bad (evil eye) and black magic. The story reveals how jealousy can lead to envy and eventually making people do horrendous things. Shafiq is a simple and common man, who lives with his family in a modest home. His brother lives in the same house upstairs. Nusrat (Shafiq’s wife and Maham’s mother, played by Fazila Qazi) despises Almas (Pervaiz’s mother, played by Sakina Samo) due to her modest background. Nusrat also believes that Almas casts evil eye on her better economic condition. Maham (played by Sarah Khan) Shafiq’s daughter does not like her cousin Pervaiz, who deeply loves her. The story further unfolds, when Nusrat’s nephew Aftab (played by Ali Abbas) asks Maham’s hand in marriage. This shakes Pervaiz and his mother Almas, as they wanted Maham to marry Pervaiz. In their jealousy and envy, they turn to black magic. What happens next is a series of horrendous and unfortunate events.

Cast

Main cast
 Azfar Rehman as Pervaiz
 Sarah Khan as Maham
 Ali Abbas as Aftab

Recurring cast
 Sakina Samo as Almas
 Fazila Qazi as Nusrat
 Nayyar Ejaz as Baba
 Beenish Raja as Shazia
 Waseem Abbas as Shafiq ur Rehman
 Faseeh Sardar as Ahmer
 Humaira Bano as Salma
 Hanif Bachchan as Attique ur Rehman
 Mizna Waqas as Umera 
 Arooba Mirza as Abeera
 Usman Patel as Babar
Tara Mahmood as Shaista
 Jameel Ahmed as Akmal
 Noman Ashraf
 Iqbal Hussain as Shamsi Chacha 
 Hajra Ali as Aneesa Yazdani 
 Awais Waseer as Shafqat
 Villayat Hussain

Availability 
The show is available on:
 MX Player
 iflix (till 2017)

Production

Post-Production delays 
The viewers mostly liked the couple of Sarah Khan and Azfar Rehman in the set of Mohabbat Aag Si. The drama was scheduled to air in 2016 but due to Azfar Rehman had to work on Hatheli, Waseem Abbas and Fazila Qazi had to work for Deewana, Sakina Samo had to work for Dil Banjaara and Ali Abbas had to work for Tum Kon Piya the project was paused. The series was again scheduled to air from 15 December 2016 but due to post-production delays, the show will air from late 25 January 2017.

See also 
 List of programs broadcast by Hum TV
 2016 in Pakistani television

References

External links 
 Official Website

Hum TV original programming
Pakistani romantic drama television series
Television magic shows
2017 Pakistani television series debuts
2017 Pakistani television series endings
Urdu-language television shows